Yadier Sánchez Sierra (born January 8, 1987) is a volleyball player from Cuba, who plays in different positions. He twice won a bronze medal with the Men's National Team in 2007.

Individual awards
 2007 Pan-American Cup "Best Spiker"
 2007 Pan-American Cup "Best Scorer"

References

 FIVB Profile

1987 births
Living people
Cuban men's volleyball players
Place of birth missing (living people)